David William Magarity (born January 26, 1950) is an American college basketball coach who most recently was the head coach of the Army Black Knights women's basketball team. He previously served as the head men's basketball coach at St. Francis (PA) and Marist.

Coaching career
Magarity landed his first coaching job at his alma mater as an assistant coach in 1974, and was elevated to head coach at St. Francis in 1978, where he was 60-76 in five seasons. After a three-year stop at Iona as an assistant under Pat Kennedy and participated in the 1984 and 1985 NCAA Division 1 Men's Basketball Tournament.  Magarity accepted the head coaching position at Marist in 1986, where he stayed for 18 seasons, amassing a 253-259 record while guiding the Red Foxes to the 1987 NCAA tournament with Rik Smits, as well as a National Invitational Tournament appearance in 1996. He won two ECAC Metro conference regular season titles, a tournament title, and one MAAC regular season title.

Magarity stepped down from Marist after the 2004 season, and became an administrator for two seasons at both the MAAC and Mid-American Conference before joining Maggie Dixon's staff at Army as a women's basketball Associate Head coach. After Dixon's death in 2006, Magarity was elevated to the position of head coach of the Black Knights.

Personal life
Magarity's daughter Maureen is a former assistant of his at Army, and was the  head coach at New Hampshire for 10 years before accepting the head coaching position at Holy Cross, like Army a member of the Patriot League. His son David played basketball at Marist. He has several other family members who played basketball at NCAA Division I schools—sisters Anne and Rosemary respectively at La Salle and Villanova, brother Bill at Georgia, and Bill's daughter Regan at Virginia Tech.

The January 9, 2021 game between Army and Holy Cross was the first time that a father and daughter coached against one another in Division I basketball.

Head coaching record

Men

Women

References

External links
 Official Biography, Army Black Knights

Living people
1950 births
American men's basketball coaches
American men's basketball players
American women's basketball coaches
Army Black Knights women's basketball coaches
Basketball coaches from Pennsylvania
Basketball players from Philadelphia
Iona Gaels men's basketball coaches
Marist Red Foxes men's basketball coaches
Saint Francis Red Flash men's basketball coaches
Saint Francis Red Flash men's basketball players